Sergio Leonardi (born 26 March 1944) is an Italian singer and actor.

Life and career 

Born in Rome, Leonardi started performing as an impersonator and singer at 16 years old. Noted by producer and songwriter Enrico Polito, he made his professional debut in the mid-1960s with the single "Capri mon Capri".  

Among his major hits, "Non ti scordar di me", a cover version of a famous Beniamino Gigli song, "Bambina", which won the Verde section at the 1968 Festivalbar, and "Whisky", the theme song of the TV-series Sheridan, squadra omicidi, later included in the musical score of The Sunday Woman.  

Starting from early 1970s Leonardi gradually focused into acting,  joining the stage company Il Bagaglino and appearing in several films.

Discography
Album
 
     1969: Dedicato a te bambina (Compagnia Generale del Disco, FG 5051)
     1973: Questo è lei (Derby, DBR 69078)
     1988: Sergio Leonardi (Compagnia Generale del Disco, LSM 1297; raccolta)
     1991: Ricomincio da Fred (Interbeat, 9031 74282-1)
     1999: Non ti scordar di me (FB, CD017)

Selected filmography
 Il provinciale (1972)
 Silver Saddle (1978)
 L'imbranato (1979)
 Il ficcanaso (1981)
 Giovani, belle... probabilmente ricche (1982)
 I camionisti (1982)

References

External links
 

 

1944 births
Living people
Singers from Rome
Italian male singers
Italian pop singers
Italian male stage actors
Italian male television actors
Italian male film actors
Male actors from Rome